Richard Dowling (born 12 December 1938) is a former Irish Fine Gael politician who served as a Teachta Dála (TD) for the Carlow–Kilkenny constituency from 1982 to 1987. He also served as a Senator for the Labour Panel from 1981 to 1982.

Dowling stood unsuccessfully as a Fine Gael candidate for Dáil Éireann in the Carlow–Kilkenny constituency at the 1981 and February 1982 general elections, and after his second defeat he was elected to the 16th Seanad as a Senator for the Labour Panel. He won a Dáil seat on his third attempt at the November 1982 general election, but served only one term. In selecting candidates before the 1987 general election the local Fine Gael party preferred Phil Hogan to Dowling, and despite their later offer to add him to the ticket, he then refused to stand.

He was first elected to Kilkenny County Council in 1974 for the Piltown local electoral area, and was a County Councillor until 2009. Dowling's home village of Newrath is near the county border with County Waterford, and Waterford city adjoins the border. The city was seeking to expand northwards across the River Suir onto land which is part of County Kilkenny, and sought a revision of the county boundaries to enable this. Dowling was a strong opponent of such expansion, describing the county boundary as "sacrosanct". When the proposal was formally made in 2005, he said "We will not be satisfied with any extension. We will not give an inch." The plan was rejected by Kilkenny County Councillors in December of that year, but in October 2007 Waterford City Council was preparing a revised plan.

References

1938 births
Living people
Fine Gael TDs
Irish schoolteachers
Local councillors in County Kilkenny
Members of the 16th Seanad
Members of the 24th Dáil
Fine Gael senators